South Baffin (Inuinnaqtun: Hivuraa Qikiqtaaluk) is a territorial electoral district (riding) for the Legislative Assembly of Nunavut, Canada.

The riding consists of the communities of Kinngait and Kimmirut.

Election results

1999 election

2004 election

2008 election

2008 by-election

2013 election

2017 election

References

External links
Website of the Legislative Assembly of Nunavut

Electoral districts of Qikiqtaaluk Region
1999 establishments in Nunavut